Lågen may refer to:

Gudbrandsdalslågen 61°08′N 10°25′E (Oppland)
Numedalslågen 59.0375°N 10.0556°E (southeastern Norway)